Michael Doyle (c. 1861 – 7 September 1942) was an Irish politician and farmer. He was a resident of the townland of Cottage, Tagoat, County Wexford. 

He was first elected to Dáil Éireann at the 1922 general election as a Farmers' Party Teachta Dála (TD) for the Wexford constituency. He was re-elected at the 1923 and June 1927 general elections. He lost his seat at the September 1927 general election. He was an unsuccessful independent candidate at the 1932 general election. At the 1933 general election, he was an unsuccessful National Centre Party candidate.

He died on 7 September 1942, aged 81.

References

External links
 

1860s births
1942 deaths
Farmers' Party (Ireland) TDs
Irish farmers
Members of the 3rd Dáil
Members of the 4th Dáil
Members of the 5th Dáil
National Centre Party (Ireland) politicians
People of the Irish Civil War (Pro-Treaty side)
Politicians from County Wexford